The 61 Football Club (Luton) is a football club based in Luton, Bedfordshire, England. The club is affiliated to the Bedfordshire County Football Association. They have reached the Second Round of the FA Vase twice in their history. They also have a reserve team that plays in the Spartan South Midlands League Reserve Group Two, and a third team who play in the Luton District and South Beds League Division One.

History
The club was formed in 1961 and was named after the year of its foundation. The team joined the Hellenic League Division Two in 1972 switching to the South Midlands League Division One a year later. They won the league in 1980–81 and gained promotion to the Premier Division in which they finished runners-up in 1982–83. The club was relegated to Division One in 1998 and further relegated to Division Two in 2004 due to ground grading issues. They won the league in 2008–09 but were not promoted, again due to ground grading.

Ground
The Kingsway Recreational Ground is a very basic council-run sports ground situated just off the A505 between Luton and Dunstable, hemmed in by housing. It has a small, basic but functional clubhouse. There are no floodlights at the venue.

Honours
South Midlands League Premier Division
Runners-up 1982–83
South Midlands League Division One
Champions 1980–81
Spartan South Midlands League Division Two
Champions 2008–09

Records
Best league performance: 2nd in South Midlands League Premier Division, 1982–83
Best FA Cup performance: never entered
Best FA Vase performance: 2nd round, 1983–84 and 1988–89

References

External links
Official website

Spartan South Midlands Football League
Football clubs in Luton
Football clubs in Bedfordshire
1961 establishments in England
Association football clubs established in 1961
Hellenic Football League
Football clubs in England